The Orleans Building in Beaumont, Texas was built in 1925 for the American National Bank. It is located at 470 Orleans St. in Downtown Beaumont. The building is 12 stories tall.

Photo gallery

See also

National Register of Historic Places listings in Jefferson County, Texas

References

External links

Buildings and structures in Beaumont, Texas
Historic district contributing properties in Texas
Office buildings completed in 1925
National Register of Historic Places in Jefferson County, Texas